Tennessee's politics are currently dominated by the Republican Party. Republicans currently hold both of the state's U.S. Senate seats, a majority of Congressional seats, and the state legislature. Democratic strength is largely concentrated in Nashville, Memphis, and parts of Knoxville, Chattanooga, and Clarksville. Several sunburn areas of Nashville and Memphis also contain significant Democratic minorities.

Table 

The following table indicates the party of elected officials in the U.S. state of Tennessee:
Governor

The table also indicates the historical party composition in the:
State Senate
State House of Representatives
State delegation to the U.S. Senate
State delegation to the U.S. House of Representatives

For years in which a presidential election was held, the table indicates which party's nominees received the state's electoral votes.

Political History of Tennessee

Pre-Civil War 
In 1789, the new United States designated this area as the "Territory of the United States, South of the River Ohio." Even though Tennessee was not yet a state, some government was organized to administer the territory. William Blount was appointed as the first official governor of Tennessee, James White became the state's first representative in Congress, and Tennessee's political party history under European Americans was started. The majority party in Tennessee began as the Democratic-Republican party and operated until 1828. That year it was dissolved and the Democratic Party was formed.

From 1828, control of Tennessee state government alternated initially between the Democratic Party and the on. Whig Party in opposition. It later became the Republican Party, shortly before the American Civil War began in 1861. While these two parties fought for the majority during these years, the Know-Nothing Party, Unionist Party, and Constitutional Party were also active in the state. Their representatives were elected to state government, but did not dominate it. The politics of Middle and Western Tennessee were dominated by planters and slaveholders, especially the major planters in the western Delta area of Memphis and environs near the Mississippi River. Overseeing a large population of enslaved African Americans, planters voted to secede at the time of the Civil War in order to protect slavery, which was profitable for them and the commodity crop of cotton. Eastern Tennessee, by contrast, had a population with higher representation of white yeomen and subsistence farmers and artisans. They supported the Union during the Civil War and resisted secession.

Civil War to WWII 
From the Civil War until World War II, Tennessee was controlled by the Democratic Party, made up of conservative whites in the state, especially of the planter and former slaveholding class. Together with other white Democratic Southerners in Congress, they formed a voting block known as the Solid South. Based on the seniority rules of the time and their virtually unrestricted control of seats from Southern states by having disenfranchised most African American at the turn of the century, senior Congressmen and Senators from the South controlled chairmanships of important committees, strongly influencing national policy. During the Great Depression, they limited benefits for African Americans in the South.

World War II to present day 
During the period from 1939 until about 1970, the conservative whites of the Democratic party in Tennessee largely controlled the state politically. A minority of Republican voters were dominant in the eastern part of the state, which had favored the Union during the Civil War. But the state had been more competitive between its two parties than others in the South, as more blacks had retained their ability to vote and supported the Republican Party into the early 20th century.

In 1976, Tennessee voted for Democrat Jimmy Carter of neighboring Georgia, a "favorite son" of the South. Similarly, in 1992 and 1996, Tennessee voted for the Democratic ticket of Governor Bill Clinton of Arkansas and Al Gore, a US senator from Tennessee, both sons of the South. But in 2000, Tennessee voted for Republican George W. Bush over Al Gore by single digit margins. Since 2000, Tennessee has become a Republican stronghold, voting increasingly republican in all following elections.

References

See also
Elections in Tennessee
Politics in Tennessee
List of United States senators from Tennessee
List of United States representatives from Tennessee
Tennessee Senate
Tennessee House of Representatives

Politics of Tennessee
Government of Tennessee
Tennessee